Winning Bicycle Racing Illustrated or Ciclisme International was an English- and French-language cycling magazine published in Belgium that covered European road racing. It ran from July 1983 to 1998.

History
Winning Bicycle Racing Illustrated was founded by Belgian journalist and publisher Jean-Claude Garot, who had previously created the weekly newspaper . Based in Brussels, Winning began as an English-language magazine first and only sold in North America, with its first issue released in July 1983. It later made a version for Belgium and France in French, as Ciclisme International, as well as a further version in the United Kingdom. Garot sold Winning US in 1997. It soon failed, and along with Ciclisme International and Winning UK, ended in 1998.

See also
 Cycle Sport (magazine)
 Cycling Weekly
 International Cycle Sport
 VeloNews

References

1983 establishments in Belgium
1998 disestablishments in Belgium
1983 establishments in the United States
1998 disestablishments in the United States
1983 establishments in Canada
1998 disestablishments in Canada
1998 disestablishments in the United Kingdom
Cycling magazines
Cycling magazines published in the United Kingdom
Defunct magazines published in Belgium
Defunct magazines published in Canada
Defunct magazines published in the United States
Defunct magazines published in the United Kingdom
English-language magazines
French-language magazines
Magazines established in 1983
Magazines disestablished in 1998
Magazines published in Brussels